The Meixi River Expressway Bridge is a cable-stayed bridge near Fengjie, Chongqing, China.

See also
Meixi River Bridge
List of tallest bridges in the world

External links
http://highestbridges.com/wiki/index.php?title=Meixihe_Bridge_Hurong

References

Bridges in Chongqing
Cable-stayed bridges in China
Bridges completed in 2010